The Franklin O-300 (company designation 6AC-298) was an American air-cooled aircraft engine of the early 1940s. The engine was of six-cylinder, horizontally-opposed layout and displaced . The 6ACG-298 featured a geared propeller drive.

An enlarged displacement version was known as the O-315, 6A3 or 6AL-315.

Variants

O-300
6AC-298
6AC-298-F3 (O-300-1) at 2,600 rpm

6ACT-298 at 3,000 rpm
6ACT-298-J4 (O-300-3) at 2,930 rpm
6ACT-298-35 (O-300-11) at 2,930 rpm

6ACG-298-P5 (O-300-9)Geared propeller drive 0.63:1,  at 3,200 rpm

6ACTS-298Supercharged,  at 3,200 rpm
6ACTS-298-K4 (O-300-7)Supercharged,  at 3,000 rpm

6ACV-298Vertical installation for helicopters, at 3,250 rpm

O-315 (6A3)
6AL-315 

6ALG-315

Applications

Direct drive
Aeronautical Products A-1
Aeronautical Products A-3
CNNA HL-6
Culver XPQ-9
Culver XPQ-14, YPQ-14A, XPQ-15
Bell 30
Bellanca T-14
Erco XPQ-13
Fleetwings 33
Hockaday Comet
Piper PT-1
Troy A
Zodiac Libra-Det

Geared drive
Culver PQ-14 Cadet
Republic RC-1 Thunderbolt (O-315)

Supercharged
Northwestern XPG-1 (Waco CG-4 twin-engine conversion)

Specifications (6AC-298)

See also

References

Notes

Bibliography

 Gunston, Bill. (1986) World Encyclopedia of Aero Engines. Patrick Stephens: Wellingborough. p. 57

Franklin aircraft engines
1940s aircraft piston engines
Boxer engines